Timothy Sommers, known professionally as One Love, is an American record producer, songwriter, and multi-instrumentalist. His professional career began after cowriting the Grammy-nominated hit "Airplanes" with long-time collaborator Kinetics. He has written and produced songs for Jennifer Lopez, Madison Beer, Lil Wayne, Eminem, Bebe Rexha, Pitbull, Adam Lambert, Hailee Steinfeld, Melanie Martinez, The Lonely Island, Michael Bolton, Anthony Ramos, FLETCHER, B.o.B, Grace VanderWaal, Quinn XCII, Marc E. Bassy, Tate McRae, Hayley Williams, Jacob Sartorius, Christina Grimmie, New Hope Club, Matoma, Jasmine Thompson, and more.

Discography

References

Living people
Year of birth missing (living people)
Record producers from Maryland
Songwriters from Maryland
Place of birth missing (living people)
American male songwriters